Mamata Banerjee was sworn in as Chief Minister of West Bengal on 27 May 2016. Here is the list of ministers.

Council of Ministers

Minister of State (Independent charge)

Minister of State

Notes

References

Trinamool Congress
Mamata Banerjee
West Bengal ministries
2016 establishments in West Bengal
Cabinets established in 2016
2